Eknath Khadse (born 2 September 1952) is a politician and leader of the Nationalist Congress Party in Maharashtra state. He was a Member of Legislative Assembly of Maharashtra from Muktainagar constituency for six consecutive terms till 2019. He was a member of the Bharatiya Janata Party from 1987 until his resignation in October 2020.

Political career

Early years
Khadse lost his first election when he contested the Gram panchayat elections in Kothadi village. Later he became sarpanch of Kothadi village in 1984, remaining sarpanch until 1987. In 1989, he was elected as member of the Maharashtra legislative assembly (MLA) for the Muktainagar constituency.

Khadse entered in active politics as a BJP worker in the 1980s and helped the party BJP establish its base in North Maharashtra. In 1990's Khadse led karsevaks during Ram Janmabhoomi movement. He was arrested at Jhansi by Uttarpradesh police and was jailed for a month.

Hailing from the influential Leva Patil community in North Maharashtra, Khadse quickly positioned himself as an OBC leader.

State Minister (1995-1999)
In 1995, Khadse became a minister in Chief Minister Manohar Joshi's state cabinet. He was close to then-deputy CM and BJP leader Gopinath Munde and handled finance and irrigation portfolios between 1995–1999. After Joshi's resignation as the chief minister, he took an oath as minister when Narayan Rane became Chief minister.

On 13 December 2005, Eknath Khadse was suspended for six months from Maharashtra state assembly's lower house due to making derogatory remarks against the then-speaker Babasaheb Kupekar and Deputy speaker Pramod Shende in their chambers.

Opposition leader (2009-2014)
Khadse served as the leader of the opposition from November 2009 to October 2014. His successful tenure as the opposition leader led BJP to the victory in later 2014 election.

2014 elections and chief minister contention
He announced breakup of long-held Shivsena-BJP alliance before 2014 assembly election and BJP decided to contest that election alone without Shiv Sena. He assured Narendra Modi that BJP can win this election on their own. After the strong showing in 2014 elections, Khadse was seen as the strong conteder for the role of Chief minister of Maharashtra, but Devendra Fadnavis was ultimately chosen for the post. Khadse held more than dozen portfolios during the first two years including ministries of excise, revenue, and agriculture.

Resignation from ministry (2016)
On 3 June 2016, Khadse resigned as Revenue Minister following allegations of corruption and misuse of office. Since then he was allegedly sidelined by BJP and ignored by central leadership.

For the 2019 Maharashtra assembly polls, BJP dropped Khadse's name from the candidate's list. Khadse blamed internal party politics, specifically Devendra Fadnavis and Girish Mahajan, for denial of a ticket. Instead the party offered ticket to his daughter Rohini Khadse-Khewalkar. She lost a closely contested election by 1987 votes against Shiv sena's Chandrakant Nimba Patil.

Resignation from the BJP and joining NCP
He quit BJP in October 2020 and joined NCP.

Controversies

Khadse was involved in controversies even before 2016 corruption charges. He first courted controversy when he advised farmers to pay their electricity bills instead of splurging money on cellphones. TV news channels and print media criticized him for wastage 10,000 lit. of water for the creation of temporary helipad in his tour of drought suffering Latur that time.

Accusations of nepotism 
Khadse's tendencies to forward the interests of his kin did not go down well with the rank and file of his party [BJP]. Many members harboured resentment over how he promoted his family members to important posts in Jalgaon. His daughter-in-law Raksha Khadse is an MP from Raver, while his daughter Rohini Khewalkar was made director of the district cooperative bank and wife Mandakini became the director of Mahanand, the state milk cooperative federation.

Corruption charges and resignation 
Khadse resigned on 3 June 2016 after allegations of impropriety surfaced against him in a land deal in Pune. Realtor Hemant Gavande leveled charges of land grabbing against him, alleging that Khadse had misused his position as the State Revenue Minister to illegally execute sales deeds for a  industrial plot at Bhosari in Pune District in the names of his wife and son-in-law. Khadse is accused of buying land at prices much lower than market price through his influence and ministry. Former Aam Aadmi Party politician and activist Anjali Damania gone on hunger strike and demanded inquiry against Eknath Khadse. She broke her hunger strike after then-CM Devendra Fadnavis assured her that he would do a proper investigation of the Pune land deal and other corruption accusations of Khadse. She filed public interest litigation against Khadse. In the retaliation Khadse filed case against her at Muktainagar accusing her maligning his image by submitting false affidavits at Bombay High court and seek her arrest. Khadse accused Damania of making false and defamatory statements against him and served defamation notice. In 2017, following orders of Bombay High Court, the state anti corruption bureau registered case against Khadse, his wife Manda Khadse, and his son-in-law Girish Choudhary.

In May 2018, Khadse claimed a clean chit from the Anti-Corruption Bureau (ACB) of the Maharashtra Police, saying the ACB wasn't able to prove the allegations.

On 30 December 2020 Enforcement Directorate summoned him on this land deal case to interrogate and ask to provide documents. Khadse later claimed that the land at Pune was purchased by his wife Manda Khadse and he personally had nothing to do with it.

Personal life
Khadse was born in Kothadi village to Ganpat Khadse and Godavari bai Khadse in Muktainagar tehsil of Jalgaon district. His son, Nikhil, committed suicide on 1 May 2013. He hails from the Leva Patil community. His daughter-in-law Raksha Khadse is a member of the 16th Lok Sabha from the Raver constituency, serving her second term.

Philanthropy
Khadse runs two private schools in Muktainagar.

Positions held 
 BJP Muktainagar taluka vice president (1980-1985)
 Sarpanch of Kothali (1984 - 1987)
 Muktainagar Panchayat samiti's member (1982-1990)
 BJP Jalgaon district president (1991-1995)
 Maharashtra BJP general secretary (1999-2004)
 Member of Maharashtra legislative assembly for Muktainagar (1989 - 2019)
 Minister for Higher and Technical Education (June 1995 to September 1995)
 Minister for Finance and Planning (September 1995 to June 1997)
 Minister for Irrigation and Command Area Development (June 1997 to October 1999)
 Leader of Opposition, Maharashtra Legislative Assembly (November 2009 to August 2014)
 Minister of Revenue, Agriculture, State Excise of Maharashtra (October 2014 to June 2016)

Further reading

References

External links
 Bio

1952 births
Living people
Bharatiya Janata Party politicians from Maharashtra
Leaders of the Opposition in the Maharashtra Legislative Assembly
Maharashtra MLAs 1990–1995
Maharashtra MLAs 1995–1999
Maharashtra MLAs 1999–2004
Maharashtra MLAs 2004–2009
Maharashtra MLAs 2009–2014
Maharashtra MLAs 2014–2019
Marathi politicians
People from Jalgaon district
State cabinet ministers of Maharashtra
Nationalist Congress Party politicians from Maharashtra